Cilmeri is a village and community in Powys, mid-Wales, United Kingdom in the historic county of Brecknockshire, two and a half miles west of Builth Wells on the A483 to Llandovery. The village is served by Cilmeri railway station on the Heart of Wales Line. In the 2001 census, Cilmeri Community had a population of 438 and 191 households. The population at the 2011 had fallen slightly to 431. The community includes the settlement of Llanganten and a small part of Builth Wells west of the River Ithon.

The village is famous for being close to the spot where the last native prince of Wales from the Royal House of Aberffraw, Llywelyn ap Gruffudd, was either killed in action or captured alive and subjected to summary execution by the soldiers of King Edward Longshanks, on 11 December 1282. A memorial stone to Llywelyn ap Gruffudd was erected on the site in 1956 and serves as the focal point for an annual ceremony of remembrance by Welsh nationalists on the anniversary of his death.

See also
 Llanfechan, a nearby community

References

External links
Official Builth Wells website
Royal Welsh Show official website
The Site of the Death of Llywelyn ap Gruffydd, Last Native Prince of Wales
Video footage and history of Cilmeri Station
Photos of Cilmeri and surrounding area, geograph.org.uk

Villages in Powys